Nabipur railway station is a railway station on the Western Railway network in the state of Gujarat, India. Nabipur railway station is 12 km far away from Bharuch railway station. It is under Vadodara railway division of Western Railway Zone. Its serves Nabipur Town. Station code of Nabipur is NIU. Passenger, MEMU and few Express trains halt at Nabipur railway station.

Nearby stations 

Chavaj is the nearest railway station towards Mumbai, whereas Varediya is the nearest railway station towards Vadodara.

Major trains 

Following Express trains halt at Nabipur railway station in both direction:

 19033/34 Valsad - Ahmedabad Gujarat Queen Express
 19023/24 Mumbai Central - Firozpur Janata Express
 19215/16 Mumbai Central - Porbandar Saurashtra Express

References

See also
 Bharuch district

Railway stations in Bharuch district
Vadodara railway division